Walter White (19 February 1904 – 1984) was a British boxer. He competed in the men's lightweight event at the 1924 Summer Olympics.

White won the 1924 Amateur Boxing Association British lightweight title, when boxing out of the United Scottish BC.

References

External links
 

1904 births
1968 deaths
British male boxers
Olympic boxers of Great Britain
Boxers at the 1924 Summer Olympics
People from Bathgate
Lightweight boxers